Hector Quintanilla Jr. (May 7, 1923 – May 18, 1998) was a United States Air Force (USAF) Lieutenant Colonel, best known as the last chief officer of Project Blue Book, the USAF's official unidentified flying object investigative arm.

Biography
Born in Monterrey, Nuevo León, Mexico in 1923, Quintanilla immigrated to the United States at age six with his parents and three brothers in 1929. He and his family crossed the Gateway to the Americas International Bridge in Laredo, Texas. His family made their home in west side San Antonio, around the Laredo and Martin street neighborhoods; the family could only afford a $1.25 a week shack with a dirt floor. Hector and his brothers did not mind, because they mostly wore their shoes on Sundays to go to church. He was selling newspapers for the San Antonio Express and San Antonio Light mornings and evenings by age seven. He would peddle his papers around the Baptist Medical Hospital area. Quintanilla also built a shoe box to shine shoes. He decided to offer shoe shine service as well, due to the reluctance of some customers to let go of 2 cents for a newspaper during hard (depression) times. He would wake up at 4:30 a.m. to prepare for his paper route. He was a student at Hawthorne Junior High School and graduated from G.W. Brackenridge High School in San Antonio in 1942. A friend later helped him get a part-time job with the U.S. Post Office. He was enrolled in St. Mary University as a freshman when he received his draft notice. He was drafted in 1943 and honorably discharged in 1945. Quintanilla served in the South Pacific Theater in the 13th Air Force, 72nd Squadron, as a bombardier.

He received a physics degree from St. Mary University in 1950. He decided to pursue a military career and was offered a commission of Second Lieutenant in the U.S. Air Force in 1951. In 1954 he was a 1st Lt, in the USAFSS 6910th Security Group in Landsberg, Bavaria. He was in charge of a Radio Traffic Analysis Group. His wife, Eleanor, joined him on this tour. His troops had been trained in San Antonio and had enjoyed Mexican food. 
http://www.raymack.com/usaf/mex_christmas.html They recalled that his beautiful wife invited them to a Mexican Christmas dinner in 1954. In 1960, Quintanilla was stationed at Griffiss Air Force Base in Rome, New York.

Quintanilla headed Project Blue Book from 1963 until its closure in 1970.  Project Blue Book began in 1952; the Air Force announced Project Blue Book's closing on December 17, 1969, with its final day of operation on January 30, 1970. Quintanilla succeeded Lieutenant Colonel Robert Friend.  He was selected to be the next Project Blue Book Officer by Colonel Eric T. de Jonckheere, who explained to Quintanilla that he was looking to fill the position with a man with a degree in physics, with maturity, drive, and a man who was cool under pressure; Quintanilla shook his head and felt he only met the physics degree requirement. Colonel Joncheere told Quintanilla to take the job for a few weeks and report back to him. Quintanilla felt he was offered the job due to his reluctance to take several other job offers in the escalating Vietnam War. Project Blue Book left a legacy of over 12,000 reported UFOs investigated of which 30 percent or over 4,000 cases, were classified as unknown.

Lieutenant Colonel Quintanilla retired after Project Blue Book was closed. Sometime afterwards, he was injured in a golf cart accident, sustaining a head injury that affected his health in later years. He died May 18, 1998, in San Antonio, Texas. Quintanilla left behind six children — Gene, Tessie, Karl, Nancy, Diane, and Bob — and several grandchildren.

Project Blue Book was often harshly criticized by those who argued it was not properly investigating UFO reports and was prone to improbable and/or untested post hoc explanations. After Blue Book folded, Quintanilla wrote a memoir, unpublished during his life and publicized in the 1990s by the National Institute for Discovery Science, which explained Quintanilla's perspective on Blue Book and UFOs.

Notes

1923 births
1996 deaths
United States Air Force officers
Mexican emigrants to the United States
Brackenridge High School alumni